Marc Alcoba (born 1 September 2000) is a Spanish Grand Prix motorcycle racer, competing in the MotoE World Cup for the OpenBank Aspar Team MotoE.

Career statistics

FIM Moto2 European Championship

Races by year
(key) (Races in bold indicate pole position) (Races in italics indicate fastest lap)

Grand Prix motorcycle racing

By season

By class

Races by year
(key) (Races in bold indicate pole position; races in italics indicate fastest lap)

 Half points awarded as less than two thirds of the race distance (but at least three full laps) was completed.

Supersport World Championship

Races by year
(key) (Races in bold indicate pole position; races in italics indicate fastest lap)

References

2000 births
Living people
Spanish motorcycle racers
Supersport World Championship riders
MotoE World Cup riders